Alexandra Phillips may refer to:
 Alex Phillips (TV presenter) (born 1983), former member of the European Parliament for South-East England, now a TV presenter for GB News
 Alexandra Phillips (Green politician) (born 1985), former member of the European Parliament for South-East England and Mayor of Brighton & Hove
 Alexandra Phillips (Germany), Miss Germany in 1999
 Alexandra Hamilton, Duchess of Abercorn, British peeress and philanthropist, born Alexandra Phillips